Reconnaissance Energy Africa Ltd., operating as ReconAfrica, is a Canadian oil and gas exploration company that operates in the Kavango in Namibia and Botswana. Headquartered in Calgary, it was co-founded by Craig Steinke and Jay Park in Vancouver. Its CEO is Scot Evans. ReconAfrica is publicly traded on the TSX Venture Exchange and the Frankfurt Stock Exchange.

Operations and history 
Co-founder Craig Steinke reportedly accessed a global dataset of potential undeveloped oil-and-gas sites and, knowing that an old well had been drilled nearby in 1964, Steinke leased the lands in early 2014.

ReconAfrica is licensed to explore a 13,200-square-mile region in the Kavango Basin in Namibia and Botswana, which is home to more than 200,000 people and vital elephant migratory routes. The region, in northwestern Botswana and northeastern Namibia, is adjacent to two national parks and two UNESCO World Heritage Sites. UNESCO has expressed concern about the proximity of ReconAfrica's exploration sites to its heritage sites. Given ReconAfrica's site's proximity to the Omuramba-Omatako river, concerns have also been raised about the possible impacts of oil-and-gas exploration and production on the water quality in the relatively water-scarce area.

ReconAfrica's contract with the Namibian government and its state-owned oil company, NAMCOR, prescribes that it will drill three wells to determine whether there are significant oil reserves in the region. ReconAfrica holds a 90% stake in that exploration license, with NAMCOR holding the remaining 10%. ReconAfrica is subjected to a 5% royalty fee and a 35% corporate tax by the Namibian government.

ReconAfrica drilled its first well in January 2021 and its second on May 5, 2021.

In 2021, ReconAfrica moved its offices from Vancouver to Calgary.

In May 2021, ReconAfrica claimed that it could generate some 100 billion barrels of oil and gas from its site in Namibia and Botswana—which is roughly equivalent to the proven oil reserves of Kuwait or the United Arab Emirates.

In 2021, U.S. Senator Patrick Leahy (D-VT) and Congressman Jeff Fortenberry (R-NE) called for a scrutiny of ReconAfrica's activities in Namibia by the U.S. Securities and Exchanges Commission.

On August 5, 2021, ReconAfrica and partner NAMCOR released a report claiming 350 metres of hydrocarbon showings from the second test well, in addition to the 250 metres found from the first well.

On October 14, 2021, Prince Harry and Reinhold Mangundu co-wrote an opinion article in the Washington Post that condemned ReconAfrica's exploratory activities.

In 2022, ReconAfrica provided N$1.2 million worth of scholarships to ten Namibian students from the Kavango East and Kavango West regions.

Stock promotions 
On January 14, 2020, the value of shares in ReconAfrica increased by 40%. ReconAfrica denied knowing of a reason for this surge in trading, but later revealed—at the request of the Investment Industry Regulatory Organization of Canada—that it had paid CA$120,000 to a German media company for a stock promotion campaign. One of the articles that was funded by ReconAfrica compared their stock to a winning lottery ticket.

On June 4, 2021, a complaint was filed with the British Columbia Securities Commission, alleging that ReconAfrica had not adequately disclosed that it changed its business model after the Namibian government prevented it from engaging in fracking.

On October 25, 2021, a class-action lawsuit was filed against several ReconAfrica executives in the United States on behalf of individuals or entities who bought shares in ReconAfrica between February 28, 2019 and September 7, 2021. The lawsuit alleged that ReconAfrica engaged in "stock pumping".

Acccording to Viceroy Research; Haywood Securities’ 2020 report ‘Chasing a giant oil resource in onshore Namibia‘ does not disclose that Sproule gave the exploration less than a 4 percent chance of success.  but talks about massive potential and quotes 'source rock specialist’ Dan Jarvie as estimating 100 plus billion barrels of oil with no evidence to support such an estimate and without disclosing that Jarvie is a shareholder and insider of  ReconAfrica. Haywood assigned the prospect of success at 27 percent without any justification.

A May 2021 article by National Geographic article revealed that the company was estimating future revenues based on fracking, which it has no licence for. While telling the Namibian public that fracking was not their intention, the company based their estimates on the Sproule Report which said the target was "Unconventionals"

Controversies 
Jay Park, ReconAfrica's chair, has been described as having been instrumental in establishing a close relationship with the Namibian Ministry of Mines and Energy, although in a 2015 report, a United Nations monitoring group alleged that he had a conflict of interest as he was then a legal advisor as Somalia's Ministry of Petroleum and Mineral Resources. The report also tied Park to a 2011 incident wherein his lawyers helped transfer a US$2-million payment from Griffiths Energy International Inc. to a company owned by the wife of the ambassador to Chad, which led to a bribery investigation by Canada's national police force.

In 2021, a Namibian organization, Frack-Free Namibia, accused the company's 2D seismic surveying—which entails repeatedly thumping the ground with accelerated weights—has caused "permanent structural damage" to nearby homes. Frack-Free Namibia claims that ReconAfrica operated within 30 metres of homes—allegedly disregarding the 0.5–1 km buffer zone that is prescribed in their environmental impact assessment.

ReconAfrica has obtained the services of Knowledge Katti, a controversial Namibian businessman who is described as having a close relationship with high-ranking government officials, including the president. ReconAfrica has reported that Katti is no longer affiliated with the company.

An April 2021 lawsuit was filed on behalf of a local farmer in Namibia's High Court, alleging that ReconAfrica had cleared land for drilling without properly consulting or compensating local residents.

The company’s EIA assessor conducted ‘consultations’ in English only, which was filled with technical jargon. The negative effects of the project were never shared with those in the licence area and the potential negative consequences have never been shared with communities. The consultant insulted opponents calling them stupid and racist and advised them to buy shares. He then threatened them with legal action for disclosing the personal attacks.

The company’s EIA has been criticised by international organizations such as the IUCN  and UNESCO who cautioned against allowing ReconAfrica to proceed on the basis of this incomplete and flawed document. Experts have pointed to shortcomings such as:
A lack of physical assessments of fauna and flora and the possible effects on local communities, on archaeological sites, and on groundwater and surface water.
The assessment, consisting only of desktop studies without any fieldwork.
The assessment left out key assessments and specialist studies.
The EIA has not identified alternatives to oil and gas extraction.
Water needs for the first wells are missing. 

In February 2022, ReconAfrica was accused of cutting through a virgin forest within environmental conservancy boundaries.

Kapinga Kamwalye Community Conservancy chairperson alleged that on 18 June, at a Farmers Union meeting, ReconAfrica's spokesperson showed him that she had access to his private WhatsApp messages, he told The Namibian. The chairperson said he reported the incident at the Rundu Police Station on 28 June.

Then Chairperson of the Kavango East and West community Association and a pair of human rights activists were detained for six hours at the Rundu Police Station, allegedly at the request of ReconAfrica. The police accused Muyemburuko and  the activists of misinforming the public and polarising communities through their activism against the Canadian company.

The police searched Muyemburoko’s phone without a warrant and detained him until seven in the evening without charge. The Police went through his private messages

On Tuesday February 21, 2023 Conservancies and Civil Society Organisations in Namibia held a protest against communities being forced to pay legal costs for challenging ReconAfrica's ECC.

References 

2014 establishments in Alberta